Ophthalmosaurus (meaning "eye lizard" in Greek) is an ichthyosaur of the Jurassic period (165–150 million years ago). Possible remains from the Cretaceous, around 145 million years ago, are also known. Named for its extremely large eyes, it had a jaw containing many small but robust teeth. Major fossil finds of this genus have been recorded in Europe with a second species possibly being found in North America.

Description 

It had a robust, streamlined body that was nearly as wide as it was tall in frontal view. Like other derived ichthyosaurs Ophthalmosaurus had a powerful tail ending in a pronounced bi-lobed caudal fluke whose lower half was formed around the caudal spine whereas the upper lobe was made up entirely from soft tissue. The limbs of Ophthalmosaurus were short and rounded with the forelimbs being noticeably larger than the hind limbs. The combination of rather inflexible trunk, powerful caudal fluke and reduced limbs suggests a tail-propelled mode of locomotion with the limbs helping with steering, differing from the anguilliform (eel-like) way more basal ichthyosaurs swam. The skull of Ophthalmosaurus was long with a slender, toothed rostrum and an enlarged posterior portion of the cranium. The dentition was relatively small with robust tooth crowns and the lateral area of the cranium was almost entirely occupied by the animal's massive eyes that gave the genus its name. The proportionally large eyes of Ophthalmosaurus measured  in diameter at the outer margin of the bony sclerotic ring, while the sclerotic aperture itself measured  in diameter.

Discovery and species 
Opthalmosaurus was first described by Harry Seeley in 1874 with particular focus on the morphology of the clavicular bones. Over the years following its description a variety of genera have been sunk into Ophthalmosaurus. Among them, Apatodontosaurus, Ancanamunia, Baptanodon, Mollesaurus, Paraophthalmosaurus, Undorosaurus and Yasykovia were all considered junior synonyms of Ophthalmosaurus in a study published by Maisch & Matzke in 2000. 

However, more recent cladistic analyses have contested Maisch & Matzke's conclusion. Mollesaurus periallus from Argentina was considered a valid genus of ophthalmosaurid by Druckenmiller and Maxwell (2010), Paraophthalmosaurus and Yasykovia were both recovered as distinct genera by Storrs et al., but were later sunk into Nannopterygius while Undorosaurus'''s validity is now accepted by most authors, including Maisch (2010) who originally proposed the synonymy. The two other Russian taxa might be also valid. Likewise the Mexican ophthalmosaurid Jabalisaurus had also been referred to Ophthalmosaurus before being described as a distinct species and genus in 2021.Ophthalmosaurus natans was described as Sauranodon, then later renamed to Baptanodon by Marsh in 1880. However this decision was questioned not long afterwards with Baptanodon instead being considered an American species of Ophthalmosaurus. Recent analysis have recovered the species as closer to other ophthalmosaurines than to the Ophthalmosaurus type species, suggesting that the previous name should be reinstated. Similarly, Ophthalmosaurus chrisorum, whose holotype has been recovered in Canada and described by Russell in 1993, was moved to its own genus Arthropterygius in 2010 by Maxwell.

While primarily known from the Jurassic, material from the Spilsby Sandstone dating to the early Berriasian stage of the Lower Cretaceous has been referred to cf. Ophthalmosaurus (i.e., either Ophthalmosaurus or a closely related species).

 Classification 
 
Within Ophthalmosauridae, Ophthalmosaurus was once considered most closely related to Aegirosaurus. However, many recent cladistic analyses found Ophthalmosaurus to nest in a clade with Acamptonectes and Mollesaurus. Aegirosaurus was found more closely related to Platypterygius, and thus does not belong to the Ophthalmosaurinae.

 Phylogeny 
The cladogram below follows Fischer et al. 2012.

The following cladogram shows a possible phylogenetic position of Ophthalmosaurus in Ophthalmosauridae according to the analysis performed by Zverkov and Jacobs (2020).

 Palaeobiology Ophthalmosaurus icenicus possessed small teeth with robust tooth crowns and signs of slight wear differing notably from the robust teeth of later species of Platypterygius, known to have hunted large prey including turtles and birds, and the minute teeth of Baptanodon, interpreted to be a soft prey specialist. Fischer et al. (2016) conclude that this intermediary tooth morphology indicates that Ophthalmosaurus icenicus was most likely a generalist predator, feeding on a variety of smaller prey items. Ophthalmosaurus could likely dive for around 20 minutes.

See also 

 List of ichthyosaurs
 Timeline of ichthyosaur research

References

External links 
 Walking With Dinosaurs - Fact File: Ophthalmosaurus

Middle Jurassic ichthyosaurs
Late Jurassic ichthyosaurs
Callovian genus first appearances
Late Jurassic extinctions
Ichthyosaurs of Europe
Jurassic France
Fossils of France
Jurassic United Kingdom
Fossils of Great Britain
Jurassic reptiles of North America
Jurassic Mexico
Fossils of Mexico
Paleontology in Wyoming
Jurassic United States
Fossils of the United States
Middle Jurassic reptiles of South America
Jurassic Argentina
Fossils of Argentina
Neuquén Basin
Fossil taxa described in 1874
Taxa named by Harry Seeley
Ophthalmosaurinae
Ichthyosauromorph genera